On 15 August 1947, one day after the independence of Pakistan through the partition of British India, the United States became one of the first nations to establish relations with Pakistan. The relations are a very important factor in the United States government's overall policy in South and Central Asia as well as Eastern Europe.

The relationship between the two nations, however, has been described as "roller coaster" given by the characterization of close coordination and lows marked by deep bilateral estrangement. From 1948 to 2013, the United States has provided a total of US$30 billion in aid to Pakistan, half of it for military purposes. Of these aid and funds arrangement, Pakistan was obligated to spend these monetary funds by purchasing American goods, food, and other services. In spite of China being the largest importer and exporter for Pakistan's market, the United States continues to be one of the largest sources of foreign direct investment in Pakistan and is Pakistan's largest export market. With U.S. military assistance suspended in 2018 and civilian aid reduced to about $300 million for 2022, Pakistani authorities have turned to other countries for help. From 1979 to 1989, the United States and Pakistan cooperated in the funding and financing of the Afghan Mujahideen who engaged the Soviet Union in the Soviet-Afghan War, with their relations taking a deep dive with the introduction of a unilateral military embargo by the United States over the covert development of nuclear weapons, which Pakistani administrators saw as the only way to defend the nation in light of India's larger military conventional attack in 1990. With sanctions waived in 1994 with Pakistan's willingness to participate with the United States in the wars in Somalia and Bosnia, the United States again suspended aid and imposed sanctions along with India in 1998, only to be lifted once again with the United States engagement in Afghanistan in 2001.

Factors involving in the contingency operations, distrust, and different priorities of both nations in the Afghan War led to serious criticism as both sides began to criticize each other's strategy to achieve common goals in the War on Terror. The American politicians at the U.S. Congress publicly accused Pakistan of harboring of Osama Bin Laden, Afghan Talibans and their "Quetta Shura" while the lawmakers in the Pakistani Parliament leveled serious accusations at the Americans doing very little to control the porous eastern border of Afghanistan, where Pakistan's most-wanted terrorist, Mullah Fazlullah and his organization were believed to be hiding. Furthermore, drone strikes by both nations, a friendly fire incident at Salala, and an incident involving the arrest of a spy in Lahore further complicated relations. These issues sharply soured the public opinion in both nations, with public opinion of each nation ranking the other as one of the least favored countries in 2013. The United States continues to blame Pakistan’s military for supporting non-state actors, including the Taliban.

Despite the troubled events and times, though, Pakistan once occupied an important place in American geopolitical strategy and has been a major non-NATO ally since 2002. After Pakistan's participation in the Afghan peace process and the Taliban retook power in Afghanistan in 2021, a sizeable number of US policy makers are revisiting the United States relations with Pakistan.

As of 2014, 59% of Pakistanis consider the United States to be an enemy, reduced from 74% in 2012. The Pakistanis have the least favorable view of US compared with 39 countries in the world surveyed by Pew. US favorability has ranged between 23 (2005) to 10 (2002) during  1999–2013). A Gallup poll showed that more than 72% of Pakistanis thought the United States was an enemy rather than a friend of Pakistan.

There are an estimated 554,202 self-identified Pakistani Americans living in the United States and about 52,486 Americans residing in Pakistan. In addition, Pakistan also hosts one of the largest embassies of the United States in Islamabad, and the largest consulate-general, in terms of both personnel and facilities, in the city of Karachi.

History

1947–1958: Relations between the United States and the newly-independent state

Following Pakistan's creation from the British Indian Empire, the nascent state struggled to position itself as a non-aligned member of the international community. Pakistan's pro-communist forces commanded considerable support in East Pakistan, while in West Pakistan, the pro-Soviet Pakistan Socialist Party remained largely marginalized. The capitalist and pro-American Pakistan Muslim League dominated much of West Pakistan's political landscape, particularly in the prosperous region of Punjab, while its base of support in East Pakistan was far more modest.

Prime Minister Liaquat Ali Khan, however, attempted to establish friendly relations with both the Soviet Union and the United States in hopes that Pakistan could benefit from an alliance with both superpowers. Both the Military of Pakistan and Foreign Service of Pakistan raised doubts as to whether the Soviets had the political will and capacity to provide military, technical, and economic aid to a similar degree that they had begun to offer to Pakistan's socialist neighbor, India. Pakistan nevertheless requested military aid from the USSR, which was predictably rebuffed as the Soviet Union had previously oriented itself with India. The government's overtures to the Soviet Union were not favorably regarded by Pakistan's conservative middle classes, who regarded the USSR as an atheist and socialist ally of India.

In 1950, the United States extended an overture to Pakistan by inviting Prime Minister Khan for an official state visit. As the USSR had rebuffed capitalist Pakistan and aligned itself with Pakistan's rivals, the country's policy crafters found that maintaining friendly relations with both superpowers was impossible. Prime Minister Khan accepted the American invitation and paid an official 23-day state visit to the United States beginning on May 3, 1950. The event was highly politicized in Pakistan, and outraged the country's leftists, and was seen as the seminal event that leads to warm diplomatic ties for several decades. However, it is alleged that during PM Khan's first visit to the US, president Truman requested Pakistan's premier to let the CIA formulate a base in Pakistan, strictly to keep an eye on the activities of Soviet Union – a request which was not granted by Khan.

Throughout the period between 1950 and 1953, several major Pakistan political and military figures paid visits to the United States. During this time, Army commander Ayub Khan paid visits to the United States – a figure who would later institute a strongly pro-American military dictatorship. Foreign Minister Sir Muhammad Zafrullah Khan, Foreign Secretary Ikram-Ullah Khan, Finance Minister Malik Ghulam Muhammad, and Defense Secretary Iskandar Mirza all paid official state visits to the United States.

Defense ties between the two countries strengthened almost immediately following Khan's visit to the United States. Personal goodwill towards Pakistan was evident even when Liaqat Ali Khan was assassinated in 1951. Under the government of Khawaja Nazimuddin, Pakistani and American officials developed positive attitudes towards one another. Such personal goodwill was evident when Secretary of State John Foster Dulles, while arguing for wheat aid to Pakistan in 1953, told the sub-committee on Agriculture and Forestry during hearings that, "the people of Pakistan had a splendid military tradition," and that in Karachi he had been met by a guard of honour which was the "finest" he had ever seen". Close ties between the countries were further consolidated by a mutual defense treaty signed in May 1954, after which hundreds of Pakistani military officers began to regularly train in the United States. A U.S. Military Assistance Advisory Group (MAAG) was also established in Rawalpindi, then capital of Pakistan. Pakistani officers were not only trained in military tactics, but also taught leadership, management, and economic theory.

In 1956, President Dwight Eisenhower requested permission from Pakistan's new Prime Minister , Huseyn Suhravardie, to lease the Peshawar Air Station (PAS), which was to be used in intelligence gathering of Soviet intercontinental ballistic missiles. The request was granted, and soon the United States built an airstrip, command and control station at the site before initiating operations. The base was regarded as top-secret, and even the high-ranking Pakistani public officials such as Zulfikar Ali Bhutto, were refused entry to the facility.

American interest in Pakistan as an ally against the spread of communism primarily was focused on maintaining excellent ties with Pakistan's military establishment. Prime Minister Huseyn Suhrawardy paid several official visits to the United States – typically with his Army commander, Ayub Khan, at his side. After a military coup d'état in 1958, Ayub Khan argued that left wing activists could seize power in Pakistan, thereby jeopardizing American interests in the region. He successfully convinced American officials that the Pakistani military was the strongest and most capable institution to govern the country.

1958–1971: relations during the military dictatorships of Ayub Khan and Yahya Khan

During the dictatorship of Ayub Khan, Pakistan enjoyed a close relationship with the United States. Ayub Khan was strongly pro-American, and on a visit the United States in 1954, before Khan was head of state, he famously told American Brigadier-General Henry A. Byroade, "I didn't come here to look at barracks. Our army can be your army if you want us. But let's make a decision". His view of the United States had remained positive by the time he seized power. In fact, during the 1960s, Pakistan's population was generally pro-American and held a similarly positive view of the United States.

In 1960, Ayub Khan granted permission for the United States to fly its first spy missions to the Soviet Union from the Peshawar Air Base, which had been recently upgraded with American funds. In May 1960, the U-2 incident took place, in which pilot Gary Powers was captured by the USSR. The CIA notified Ayub Khan of the incident while he was in London for a state visit: he reportedly shrugged his shoulders and stated that he had expected such an incident would eventually happen.

In 1961, Khan paid his first visit to the United States as head of state. American goodwill towards Khan was evident by an elaborate state dinner held at Mount Vernon, and a ticker tape parade for Khan in New York City.

American military aide was concentrated in West Pakistan, with economic benefits were controlled by and almost exclusively used by West Pakistan. East Pakistani anger towards an absence of economic development was directed towards the United States, as well as West Pakistan. The East-Pakistan parliament passed a resolution denouncing the 1954 military pact with the United States.

Economic aid to Pakistan was further increased by the United States through the consortium companies. West Pakistan's high rate of economic growth during this time period brought wide regard to Pakistan as a model of successful implementation of capitalism in a developing country; in 1964, GDP growth was 9.38%.

In 1962, relations began cooling. In the aftermath of India's major defeat in the Sino-Indian War, the United States shipped arms to India. It did not provide notice to Pakistan and ignored Pakistan's concerns that these arms might be used by India against Pakistan. Additionally, Ayub Khan was disappointed that Pakistan's decision not to take advantage of Indian vulnerabilities during its war with China was not rewarded with serious United States efforts in negotiations to settle the Kashmir dispute. 

Convinced that diplomatic solutions would not favor Pakistan, Pakistan launched Operation Gibraltar against India, which escalated to the Indo-Pakistani War of 1965, with results favoring India. Economic growth in 1965 was a mere 0.88%. The economy rapidly rebounded with a GDP growth of 2.32% in 1966, and 9.79% in 1969. However, given the huge economic cost of the war without any clear victory (or loss), Khan surrendered his presidential powers to Army Commander General Yahya Khan (no relation) in 1969.

American President Lyndon Johnson cultivated warm personal relations with Indian and Pakistani leaders, This policy had unintended negative consequences.  Since 1954, the American alliance with Pakistan caused India to move closer to the Soviet Union. Johnson hoped that a more evenhanded policy towards both countries would soften the tensions in South Asia, and bring both nations closer to the United States. With a major presence already in Vietnam, Johnson ended the traditional American division of South Asia into 'allies' and 'neutrals'. He had a plan to develop good relations with both India and Pakistan, supplying arms and money to both, and to maintain neutrality from their intense border feuds. The result was that his even-handedness pushed Pakistan closer to Communist China and India closer to the Soviet Union.

Pakistan's role in U.S.-China relations
President Richard Nixon and Henry Kissinger took advantage of Pakistan's close relationship with the People's Republic of China to initiate secret contacts that resulted in Henry Kissinger's secret visit to China in July 1971 after visiting Pakistan. The contacts resulted in the 1972 Nixon visit to China and the subsequent normalizing of relations between the United States and the People's Republic of China.

1971: Relations during war

At the onset of hostilities between India and Pakistan which led to the two-week December Indo-Pakistani War of 1971, President Nixon urged Yahya Khan to restrain Pakistani forces, in order to prevent escalation of the war, and to safeguard Pakistan's interests – Nixon feared that an Indian invasion of West Pakistan would lead to socialist India's domination of the subcontinent, thereby strengthening the position of the Soviet Union. Yahya Khan feared that an independent Bangladesh would lead to the disintegration of West Pakistan.  However, Indian military support for Bengali guerrillas and a massive flood of Bengali refugees into India led to the escalation of hostilities and declared war between India and Pakistan.

The United States secretly encouraged the shipment of military equipment from the Shah's Iran, Turkey, and Jordan to Pakistan, and reimbursed those countries for their shipments, despite Congressional objections. The United States, however, also threatened to cut-off aid to pressure Pakistan to end hostilities, but did not wish for India to dominate the new political landscape in South Asia either.

As it was the height of the Vietnam War, the United States show of force was seen as a sign of support for the beleaguered West Pakistan Armed Forces.

Declassified CIA intelligence documents stated that "India intended to dismember Pakistan and destroy its armed forces, a possible loss of U.S. ally in the Cold war that the United States cannot afford to lose." Nixon termed India a "Soviet stooge" before ordering the Enterprise to lead the Task Force-74. In an assessment completed by the United States, India was seen as being able to summarily defeat Pakistan, were India to receive the full backing of Soviet Union. Nixon sent a message to Soviet Union urging Russians to stop backing India. In Nixons' words: "In the strongest possible...(...)... terms to restrain India with which ... (Soviets) have great influence and for whose actions you must share responsibility".

Democratic government (1971–1977)

As a result of the 1970s election, Zulfikar Ali Bhutto, a charismatic democratic socialist, became President (1971–1974) and later Prime Minister in 1974. This period is seen as a "quiet cold war" with Pakistan and its democratic socialist government led by Bhutto. His socialist ideas favored the communist ideas but never actually allied with communism. Under Bhutto, Pakistan would focus on the Movement of Non-Aligned Countries, building closer ties with the Soviet bloc and the Soviet Union. Meanwhile, Bhutto tried to maintain a balance with the United States, but such attempts were rebuffed. Bhutto opposed the ultra-leftism concepts but was a strong proponent of left-wing politics, which the U.S. had opposed in Pakistan from the very start.

Although Richard Nixon enjoyed firm relations with Bhutto and was a close friend of his, relations significantly soured under the presidency of Jimmy Carter. Carter, an anti-socialist, tightened the embargo placed on Pakistan and put pressure on the government through the United States Ambassador to Pakistan, Brigadier-General Henry Byroade. The socialist leanings of the government and Bhutto's proposed left-wing theories, had badly upset the United States, with some fearing the loss of Pakistan as an ally in the Cold War. The leftist ideas of the government and Bhutto's policy towards the Soviet Union was seen by the United States as sympathetic. It had also built a bridge for the Soviet Union to gain naval access in Pakistan's warm water ports, something that both the United States and the Soviet Union lacked.

During the course of 1976 presidential election, Carter was elected as U.S. President, and in his inaugural speech, he announced his determination to seek the ban of nuclear weapons. With Carter's election, Bhutto lost all the links to United States administration that he had through President Nixon. Bhutto had to face the embargo and pressure from an American President who was completely against the political objectives that Bhutto had set out to accomplish. In his speech Carter had indirectly announced his opposition to Bhutto, his ambitions, and the elections. Responding to President Carter, Bhutto launched a more aggressive and serious diplomatic offensive on the United States and the Western world over the nuclear issues. Bhutto's hard-line stance on nuclear issues put the United States, particularly Carter who found it extremely difficult to counter Bhutto on Defensive position at the United Nations. India and the Soviet Union were pushed aside when Bhutto attacked the Indian nuclear programme, labeling the latter's program as based on nuclear proliferation. Writing to the world and Western leaders, Bhutto made his intentions clear to the United States and the rest of the world:

Although Carter placed an embargo on Pakistan, Bhutto, under the technical guidance and diplomatic advice of Foreign minister Aziz Ahmed, succeeded in buying sensitive equipment, common metal materials, and electronic components, marked as "common items," hiding the true purpose of the purchases and greatly enhancing the atomic bomb project. Bhutto tried to resolve the issue, but Carter intentionally sabotaged the talks. In a thesis written by historian Abdul Ghafoor Buhgari, Carter is accused of having sabotaged Bhutto's credibility. However, he was not in favour of his execution as Carter and called on General Zia-ul-Haq to spare his life. The senior leadership of the Pakistan Peoples Party reached out to different countries' ambassadors and high commissioners but did not meet with the U.S. ambassador, as the leadership knew the "noble" part played by Carter and his administration. When the Carter administration discovered Bhutto's nuclear programme, it had already reached an advanced stage and had a disastrous effect on SALT I Treaty which was soon to collapse. This was a failure of President Carter to stop atomic proliferation as the arms race between the Soviet Union and the United States heightened.

In 1974, with India carried out the test of nuclear weapons near the Pakistan's eastern border, codename Smiling Buddha, Bhutto sought the United States to impose economic sanctions in India. Though it was unsuccessful approach, in a meeting of Pakistan's Ambassador to the United States with Secretary of State Henry Kissinger, Kissinger told Pakistan's ambassador to Washington that the test is "a fait accompli and that Pakistan would have to learn to live with it", although he was aware this is a "little rough" on the Pakistanis. In the 1970s, the ties were further severed with Bhutto as Bhutto had continued to administer the research on weapons, and in 1976, in a meeting with Bhutto and Kissinger, Kissinger had told Bhutto, "that if you [Bhutto] do not cancel, modify or postpone the Reprocessing Plant Agreement, we will make a horrible example from you". The meeting was ended by Bhutto as he had replied: "For my country's sake, for the sake of people of Pakistan, I did not succumb to that black-mailing and threats". After the meeting, Bhutto intensified his nationalization and industrialization policies, as well as aggressively taking steps to spur scientific research on atomic weapons and the atomic bomb project. Bhutto authorized the construction of Chagai weapon-testing laboratories, whilst the United States opposed the action and predicted that it will lead to a massive and destructive war between India and Pakistan in the future. The atomic bomb project became fully mature in 1978, and a first cold test was conducted in 1983 (see Kirana-I).

Bhutto called upon Organization of Islamic Conference in order to bring Muslim world together but after months, the pro-United States Muslim nations and the United States itself took the promised step and Bhutto was declared as the corrupted one, and, as a result, Bhutto was hanged in 1979.

Military dictatorship (1977–1988)

In 1979, a group of Pakistani students burned the American embassy in Islamabad to the ground, as a reaction to the Grand Mosque Seizure, citing U.S. involvement. Two Americans were killed.

After the removal and death of Bhutto, Pakistan's ties with the United States were better and improved. On December 24, 1979, the Soviet 40th Army crossed borders, rolling into Afghanistan, President Carter issued his doctrine (see Carter Doctrine). The silent features offers the creation of the Rapid Deployment Force (RDF), increasing the deployment of United States Naval Forces Central Command (NAVCENT), a collective security framework in the region and a commitment to the defence of Pakistan by transfer of significant amount of weapons and Monetarism.

Following the Soviet invasion of Afghanistan, ISI and CIA ran multibillion-dollar worth Operation Cyclone to thwart the communist regime as well as defeating Soviets in Afghanistan. Throughout the military regime of General Zia-ul-Haq, the ties and relations were promoted at its maximum point, and the United States had given billion dollars of economic and military aid to Pakistan. The Soviet invasion of Afghanistan in December 1979 highlighted the common interest of Pakistan and the United States in opposing the Soviet Union. In 1981, Pakistan and the United States agreed on a $3.2 billion military and economic assistance program aimed at helping Pakistan deal with the heightened threat to security in the region and its economic development needs. With US assistance, in the largest covert operation in history, Pakistan armed and supplied anti-Soviet fighters in Afghanistan.

In the 1980s, Pakistan agreed to pay $658 million for 28 F-16 fighter jets from the United States; however, the US congress froze the deal, citing objections to Pakistan's nuclear ambitions. Under the terms of the American cancellation, the US kept both the money and the planes, leading to angry claims of theft by Pakistanis.

Initially, Carter offered Pakistan $325 million in aid over three years; Zia rejected this as "peanuts." Carter also signed the finding in 1980 that allowed less than $50 million a year to go to the Mujahideen. All attempts were rebuffed, Zia shrewdly played his cards knowing that Carter was on his way out and he may get a better deal from the incoming Reagan. After Ronald Reagan came to office, defeating Carter for the US presidency in 1980, all this changed, due to President Reagan's new priorities and the unlikely and remarkably effective effort by Congressman Charles Wilson (D-TX), aided by Joanne Herring, and CIA Afghan Desk Chief Gust Avrakotos to increase the funding for Operation Cyclone. Aid to the Afghan resistance, and to Pakistan, increased substantially, finally reaching $1 billion. The United States, faced with a rival superpower looking as if it were to create another Communist bloc, now engaged Zia in fighting a US-aided war by proxy in Afghanistan against the Soviets.

The Reagan administration and Reagan himself supported Pakistan's military regime, American officials visited the country on a routine basis. The U.S. political influence in Pakistan effectively curbed down the liberals, socialists, communists, and democracy advocates in the country in 1983, instead advising Zia to hold the non-partisans elections in 1985. General Akhtar Abdur Rahman of ISI and William Casey of CIA worked together in harmony, and in an atmosphere of mutual trust. Reagan sold Pakistan $3.2 billion worth of attack helicopters, self-propelled howitzers, armoured personnel carriers, 40 F-16 Fighting Falcon warplanes, nuclear technology, naval warships, and intelligence equipment and training.

Democratic governments (1988–1998)

After the restoration of democracy after the disastrous and mysterious death of Zia and U.S. Ambassador in an aviation crash, relations deteriorated quickly with upcoming Prime Minister s Benazir Bhutto and Nawaz Sharif. The United States took a tough stand on Pakistan's nuclear development, passing the Pressler amendment, while significantly improving the relations with India. Both Benazir and Nawaz Sharif also asked the United States to take steps to stop the Indian nuclear program, feeling that United States was not doing enough to address what Pakistan saw as an existential threat. Pakistan found itself in a state of extremely high insecurity as tensions mounted with India and Afghanistan's infighting continued. Pakistan's alliance with the U.S. was strained due to factors such as its support for the Taliban and public distancing of the Pakistani government from the U.S.

Rift in relations
In 1992 US Ambassador Nicholas Platt advised Pakistan's leaders that if Pakistan continued to support terrorists in India or Indian-administered territory, "the Secretary of State may find himself required by law to place Pakistan on the state sponsors of terrorism list."  When the US decided to respond to the 1998 United States embassy bombings in Africa by firing missiles at an al-Qaeda camp in Taliban-controlled Afghanistan, five Pakistani ISI agents present at the camp were killed.

Economic embargo

In 1989, Benazir Bhutto made a quick visit in the U.S. asking U.S. to stop financing the Afghan mujahideen to President George H. W. Bush, which she marked "America's Frankenstein". This was followed by Nawaz Sharif who visited the U.S. in 1990, but U.S. gave cold shoulder to Pakistan, asking Pakistan to stop developing the nuclear deterrence. In 1990, Prime Minister Nawaz Sharif travelled to the U.S. to solve the nuclear crises after the U.S. had tightened its economic embargo on Pakistan, prompting Sharif and then-Treasure Minister Sartaj Aziz to hold talks on Washington.  It was widely reported in Pakistan that the U.S. Assistant Secretary of State Teresita Schaffer had told the Foreign Minister Shahabzada Yaqub Khan to halt the uranium enrichment programme. In December 1990, France's Commissariat à l'énergie atomique agreed to provide a commercial 900MW power plant, but plans did not materialize as France wanted Pakistan to provide entire financial funds for the plant. Furthermore, the U.S. Ambassador Robert Oakley further influenced on the project, showing growing concerns of the U.S. on the agreement. While talking to U.S. media, Nawaz Sharif declared that: "Pakistan possessed no [atomic] bomb... Pakistan would be happy to sign the Nuclear Nonproliferation Treaty (NPT) but it must be provided "first" to India to do the same". After France's project was cancelled, Nawaz Sharif successfully held talks with the China to build the largest commercial nuclear plant, CHASNUPP-I in Chasma city in Pakistan.

In 1995, Prime Minister Benazir Bhutto made a final visit to U.S. urging President Bill Clinton to amend the Pressler Amendment and emphasized the United States to launch a campaign against extremism, with Pakistan allying with the United States. Prime Minister Benazir Bhutto was successful in passing the Brown Amendment, but the embargo on arms remained active. During the United States trip, Prime Minister Benazir Bhutto faced heated criticism and opposition on the nuclear weapons program, who however responded fiercely and in turn sharply criticized U.S.'s nonproliferation policy and demanded that the United States honor its contractual obligation. Although Benazir was able to convince the U.S. business community to invest in Pakistan, she was unable to revert the economic embargo which kept investment away from the country.

In 1998, Prime Minister Nawaz Sharif ordered to conduct first nuclear tests after Benazir Bhutto called for the tests (see Chagai-I and Chagai-II), in response to Indian nuclear tests (see Pokhran-II). Nawaz Sharif's ordering the nuclear tests was met with great hostility and ire in the United States after President Clinton placing the economic embargo on Pakistan. The relations were also refrained and strained after Nawaz Sharif became involved with Kargil war with India, while India's relations with Israel and U.S. greatly enhanced. Soon after the tests, Benazir Bhutto publicly announced her belief that her father was "sent to the gallows at the instance of the superpower for pursuing the nuclear capability, though she did not disclose the name of the power. In 1999, Benazir leaked the information that Nawaz Sharif would be deposed that there is (nothing) that Americans want to support Nawaz Sharif or the democracy in Pakistan. After the military coup was commenced against Nawaz Sharif, the President Clinton criticized the coup demanding the restoration of democracy but did not favor the mass demonstration against the military regime as the coup, at that time, was popular. In conclusion, both Nawaz Sharif and Benazir Bhutto refused to make compromises with respect to the country's nuclear deterrence, instead building infrastructure despite U.S. objections.

Cold war legacies and trade sanctions

CENTO and SEATO
Pakistan was a leading member of the Central Treaty Organization (CENTO) and the Southeast Asia Treaty Organization (SEATO) from its adoption in 1954–55 and allied itself with the United States during the most of the Cold war. In 1971–72, Pakistan ended its alliance with the United States after the East-Pakistan war in which East Pakistan successfully seceded with the aid of India. The promise of economic aid from the United States was instrumental in creating these agreements.

During the Indo-Pakistani War of 1965, the United States refused to provide any military support to as against its pledged. This generated widespread anti-American feelings and emotions in Pakistan that the United States was no longer a reliable ally. According to C. Christine Fair, the U.S. cut off arms supplies because Pakistan "started the war with India by using regular military personnel disguised as mujahideen."  According to Fair, in 1971 "the Pakistanis were angry at the U.S. again, for not bailing them out from another war they started against India."

Trade embargo
In April 1979, the United States suspended most economic assistance to Pakistan over concerns about Pakistan's atomic bomb project under the Foreign Assistance Act.

September 2001 and after

After the September 11 attacks in 2001 in the United States, Pakistan became a key ally in the war on terror with the United States. In 2001, US President George W. Bush pressured the government into joining the US the war on terror. Pervez Musharraf acknowledges the payments received for captured terrorists in his book:

In 2003, the US officially forgave US$1 billion in Pakistani debt in a ceremony in Pakistan in turn for Pakistan joining the US 'war on terror'. "Today's signing represents a promise kept and another milestone in our expanding partnership," US Ambassador Nancy Powell said in a statement, "The forgiveness of $1 billion in bilateral debt is just one piece of a multifaceted, multi-billion dollar assistance package." The new relationship between the United States and Pakistan is not just about September 11,' Powell said. "It is about the rebirth of a long-term partnership between our two countries." However, Pakistan support of the U.S. and its war has angered many Pakistanis that do not support it.

In October 2005, Condoleezza Rice made a statement where she promised that the United States will support the country's earthquake relief efforts and help it rebuild" after the Kashmir earthquake.

Alliance with United States
Prior to the September 11 attacks in 2001, Pakistan and Saudi Arabia were key supporters of the Taliban in Afghanistan, as part of their "strategic depth" objective vis-a-vis India, Iran, and Russia.

After 9/11, Pakistan, led by General Pervez Musharraf, reversed course as they were under pressure from the United States and joined the "War on Terror" as a U.S. ally. Having failed to convince the Taliban to hand over bin Laden and other members of Al Qaeda, Pakistan provided the U.S. a number of military airports and bases for its attack on Afghanistan, along with other logistical support. Since 2001, Pakistan has arrested over five hundred Al-Qaeda members and handed them over to the United States; senior U.S. officers have been lavish in their praise of Pakistani efforts in public while expressing their concern that not enough was being done in private. However, General Musharraf was strongly supported by the Bush administration.

In return for their support, Pakistan had sanctions lifted and has received about $10 billion in U.S. aid since 2001, primarily military. In June 2004, President George W. Bush designated Pakistan as a major non-NATO ally, making it eligible, among other things, to purchase advanced American military technology.

Pakistan has lost thousands of lives since joining the U.S. war on terror in the form of both soldiers and civilians and was going through a critical period, however many areas of Pakistan are becoming terror free. Suicide bombs were commonplace in Pakistan, whereas they were unheard of prior to 9/11. The Taliban have been resurgent in recent years in both Afghanistan and Pakistan. Hundreds of thousands of refugees have been created internally in Pakistan, as they have been forced to flee their homes as a result of fighting between Pakistani forces and the Taliban in the regions bordering Afghanistan and further in Swat.

A key campaign argument of US President Barack Obama was that the US had made the mistake of "putting all our eggs in one basket" in the form of General Musharraf. Musharraf was eventually forced out of office under the threat of impeachment, after years of political protests by lawyers, civilians and other political parties in Pakistan. With Obama coming into office, the U.S. is expected to triple non-military aid to Pakistan to $1.5 billion per year over 10 years, and to tie military aid to progress in the fight against militants. The purpose of the aid is to help strengthen the relatively new democratic government led by President Zardari and to help strengthen civil institutions and the general economy in Pakistan and to put in place an aid program that is broader in scope than just supporting Pakistan's military.

In 2020, Imran Khan said the US was pressuring Pakistan to recognize Israel and said it was because of: "Israel's deep impact in the United States" Khan also said: "Israel's lobby is the most powerful, and that's why America's whole Middle East policy is controlled by Israel,"

Aid from the United States since 9/11

Pakistan is a major non-NATO ally as part of the War on Terrorism, and a leading recipient of U.S. aid. Between 2002 and 2013, Pakistan received $26 billion in economic and military aid and sales of military equipment. The equipment included eighteen new F-16 aircraft, eight P-3C Orion maritime patrol aircraft, 6,000 TOW anti-tank missiles, 500 AMRAM air-to-air missiles, 6 C-130 transport aircraft, 20 Cobra attack helicopters, and a Perry-class missile frigate. About half of the aid package was disbursed during the Bush administration and other half during the Obama administration. The aid during the Obama administration was more economic than military.

Trust deficit issues
In 2008, NSA Director Mike McConnell confronted ISI Director Ahmad Shuja Pasha, claiming that the ISI was tipping off jihadists so that they could escape in advance of American attacks against them.

On 11 June 2008, the Gora Prai airstrike, on the Afghan-Pakistani border, killed 10 members of the paramilitary Frontier Corps. The Pakistani military condemned the airstrike as an act of aggression, souring the relations between the two countries. However, after the drone attacks in June, President Bush had said 'Pakistan is strong ally '. Western officials have claimed nearly 70%( roughly $3.4 billion) of the aid given to the Pakistani military has been misspent in 2002–2007. However U.S.-Pakistani relationship has been a transactional based and US military aid to Pakistan has been shrouded in secrecy for several years until recently. Furthermore, a significant proportion of US economic aid for Pakistan has ended up back in the US as funds are channeled through large US contractors. US Representative Gary Ackerman also said a large sum of US economic aid has not left the US as it spent on consulting fees and overhead cost.

In the November 2008 Mumbai Attacks, the United States informed Pakistan that it expected full cooperation in the hunt for the plotters of the attacks.

Border engagement and skirmishes

The United States and Pakistan have experienced several military confrontations on the Afghanistan-Pakistan border. These skirmishes took place between American forces deployed in Afghanistan, and Pakistani troops guarding the border. On November 26, 2011, 28 Pakistani soldiers were killed in an aerial attack on Pakistani positions near the border. The attack further damaged US-Pakistani relations with many in Pakistan calling for a more hardline stance against the United States.

Following the incident, US Secretary of State Hillary Clinton, and Defense Secretary Leon Panetta spoke to their Pakistani counterparts to give their "deepest condolences" in a joint statement and also supported a NATO investigation. A NATO spokesman also said that NATO "regrets the loss of life of any Pakistani servicemen".

2009: U.S. military and economic aid

On 14 September 2009, former President of Pakistan, Pervez Musharraf, admitted that American foreign aid to Pakistan had been diverted from its original purpose of fighting the Taliban to preparing for war against neighboring India. The United States government has responded by stating that it will take these allegations seriously. However Pervez Musharraf also said, '"Wherever there is a threat to Pakistan, we will use it [the equipment] there. If the threat comes from al-Qaeda or Taliban, it will be used there. If the threat comes from India, we will most surely use it there."

In late 2009, Hillary Clinton made a speech in Pakistan about the war against the militants and said: "...we commend the Pakistani military for their courageous fight, and we commit to stand shoulder to shoulder with the Pakistani people in your fight for peace and security."In October 2009, the US Congress approved $7.5 billion of non-military aid to Pakistan over the next five years via the Kerry-Lugar Bill. In February 2010, US President Barack Obama sought to increase funds to Pakistan to "promote economic and political stability in strategically important regions where the United States has special security interests". Obama also sought $3.1 billion aid for Pakistan to defeat Al Qaeda for 2010.

On December 1, 2009, President Barack Obama in a speech on a policy about Pakistan said "In the past, we too often defined our relationship with Pakistan narrowly. Those days are over.... The Pakistani people must know America will remain a strong supporter of Pakistan's security and prosperity long after the guns have fallen silent so that the great potential of its people can be unleashed." President Obama also said, "In the past, we too often defined our relationship with Pakistan narrowly, those days are over. Moving forward, we are committed to a partnership with Pakistan that is built on a foundation of mutual interests, mutual respect and mutual trust" and that the two countries "share a common enemy' in combating Islamic extremism."

In the aftermath of a thwarted bombing attempt on a 2009 Northwest Airlines flight, the U.S. Transportation Security Administration (TSA) issued a new set of screening guidelines that includes pat-downs for passengers from countries of interest, which includes Pakistan. In a sign of widening fissures between the two allies,  on January 21, Pakistan declined a request by the United States to launch new offensives on militants in 2010. Pakistan say it "can't launch any new offensives against militants for six months to a year because it wants to 'stabilize' previous gains made. However, the US praises Pakistan's military effort against the militants. Furthermore, Pakistan president, in meeting with the U.S. delegation, had said Pakistan "had suffered a... loss of over 35 billion dollars during the last eight years as a result of the fight against militancy." But the President also called for "greater Pak-U.S. cooperation".

2010: Coalition partnership issues
In February 2010, Anne W. Patterson (U.S. Ambassador to Pakistan) said that the United States is committed to a partnership with Pakistan and further said “Making this commitment to Pakistan while the U.S. is still recovering from the effects of the global recession reflects the strength of our vision. Yet we have made this commitment, because we see the success of Pakistan, its economy, its civil society and its democratic institutions as important for ourselves, for this region and for the world.”

Between 2002 and 2010, Pakistan received approximately $18 billion in military and economic aid from the United States. In February 2010, the Obama administration requested an additional $3 billion in aid, for a total of $20.7 billion.

In mid-February 2010, after the capture of the second most powerful Taliban, Abdul Ghani Baradar in Pakistan by Pakistani forces, the White House hailed the operation. Furthermore, White House Press Secretary Robert Gibbs said that this is a "big success for our mutual efforts(Pakistan and United States)in the region" and praised Pakistan for the capture, saying it was a sign of increased cooperation with the US in the terror fight.

In March, Richard Holbrooke, then US special envoy to Pakistan, said that US-Pakistani relations have seen "significant improvement" under Obama. He also said, "No government on earth has received more high-level attention" than Pakistan.

2011: American accusations and attacks in Pakistan

2011 was rated by the BBC as a "disastrous year" for Pakistan-U.S. relations, primarily due to three events: the Raymond Allen Davis incident, the death of Osama bin Laden and the Salala incident. As early as 2005, Western criticism against Pakistan grew and many European and American political correspondents criticized Pakistan at the public level. The London-based The Economist in fact observed: "As an American ally, Pakistan has become an embarrassment for the United States."  In January 2011, the Raymond Allen Davis incident occurred in which Raymond Davis, an alleged private security contractor, shot dead two Pakistani locals. The action sparked protests in Pakistan and threatened relations between the United States and Pakistan, including aid flows. Pakistan prosecuted him despite US demands for him to be freed because he enjoys diplomatic immunity. Ultimately he was freed after the United States made payments to the families of the slain Pakistanis, but the incident was emblematic of the volatile nature of American-Pakistani relations. In spite of this rocky relationship, the United States has stated that it remains committed to assisting Pakistan's new democratic government in the areas of development, stability, and security.

The CIA had long suspected Osama Bin Laden of hiding in Pakistan. India and US have also accused Pakistan of giving safe-haven to the Taliban. However, Pakistan has repeatedly denied these accusations.

The attack on the US embassy and the NATO headquarters in Kabul were blamed on the Haqqani Network, which US Admiral Mike Mullen called "a veritable arm of Pakistan's Inter-Services Intelligence Agency." Pakistan reacted by recalling its finance minister who was on a visit to the U.N. Pakistan also tried to strengthen the relationship with China and Saudi Arabia to counter the U.S. The Chinese government advised Pakistan against any commitments that could jeopardize China's relationships with US and India. The United States reissued a call urging Pakistan to act against the Haqqani Network or else the US would be forced to take on the threat unilaterally. Islamic groups in Pakistan, issued a fatwa proclaiming Jihad against the US. This was followed by Pakistan threatening the US with retaliation, if the US went ahead with unilateral action against the Haqqani network.

In May 2011, Pakistani journalist Saleem Shahzad was killed and in September, The New Yorker reported that the order to kill Shahzad came from an officer on General Kayani's staff. In July Admiral Mullen alleged that Shahzad's killing had been "sanctioned by the government" of Pakistan, but the ISI denied any involvement in the Shahzad murder.

It was reported in 2011 that academics and journalists in the United States have been approached by Inter-Services Intelligence spies, who threatened them not to speak about the Balochistan independence movement, as well as human rights abuses by the Pakistani Army, or else their families would be harmed.

Collapse of alliance and death of Osama bin Laden

Osama bin Laden, then head of the militant group al-Qaeda, was killed in Pakistan on May 2, 2011, shortly after 1 a.m. local time by a United States special forces military unit. The operation, codenamed Operation Neptune Spear, was ordered by United States President Barack Obama and carried out in a US Central Intelligence Agency (CIA) operation by a team of United States Navy SEALs from the United States Naval Special Warfare Development Group (also known as DEVGRU or informally by its former name, SEAL Team Six) of the Joint Special Operations Command, with support from CIA operatives on the ground.

According to Obama administration officials, US officials did not share information about the raid with the government of Pakistan until it was over. Chairman of the Joint Chiefs of Staff Michael Mullen called Pakistan's army chief Ashfaq Parvez Kayani at about 3 a.m. local time to inform him of the Abbottabad Operation.

According to the Pakistani foreign ministry, the operation was conducted entirely by US forces. Pakistan Inter-Services Intelligence (ISI) officials said they were also present at what they called a joint operation; President Asif Ali Zardari flatly denied this. Pakistan's foreign secretary Salman Bashir later confirmed that Pakistani military had scrambled F-16s after they became aware of the attack but that they reached the compound after American helicopters had left.

2012–13: American sentiment against Pakistan

Since some in the U.S. government claimed that they had caught bin Laden without Pakistani help, numerous allegations were made that the government of Pakistan had shielded bin Laden. Critics cited the very close proximity of bin Laden's heavily fortified compound to the Pakistan Military Academy, that the US chose not to notify Pakistani authorities before the operation and the double standards of Pakistan regarding the perpetrators of the 2008 Mumbai attacks.

However, according to Steve Coll, as of 2019 there is no direct evidence showing Pakistani knowledge of bin Laden's presence in Abbottabad, even by a rogue or compartmented faction within the government, other than the circumstantial fact of bin Laden's compound being located near (albeit not directly visible from) the Pakistan Military Academy. Documents captured from the Abbottabad compound generally show that bin Laden was wary of contact with Pakistani intelligence and police, especially in light of Pakistan's role in the arrest of Khalid Sheikh Mohammed; it has also been suggested that the $25 million U.S. reward for information leading to bin Laden would have been enticing to Pakistani officers given their reputation for corruption. The compound itself, although unusually tall, was less conspicuous than sometimes envisaged by Americans, given the common local habit of walling off homes for protection against violence or to ensure the privacy of female family members.

According to the leaked files, in December 2009, the government of Tajikistan had also told US officials that many in Pakistan were aware of bin Laden's whereabouts.

CIA chief Leon Panetta said the CIA had ruled out involving Pakistan in the operation, because it feared that "any effort to work with the Pakistanis could jeopardize the mission. They might alert the targets." However, Secretary of State Hillary Clinton stated that "cooperation with Pakistan helped lead us to bin Laden and the compound in which he was hiding." Obama echoed her sentiments. John O. Brennan, Obama's chief counterterrorism advisor, said that it was inconceivable that bin Laden did not have support from within Pakistan. He further stated, "People have been referring to this as hiding in plain sight. We are looking at how he was able to hide out there for so long."

In 2012, Shakil Afridi, a doctor who had set up a fake vaccination campaign – in cooperation with the United States in searching for Al Qaeda and bin Laden – was convicted of treason by Pakistan, and sentenced to 33 years in prison. The United States Congress voted to cut 33 million dollars in aid to Pakistan: 1 million dollars for every year that Shakil Afridi was sentenced to prison. The role of Dr. Afridi was exposed by the British newspaper The Guardian in July 2011. CIA's fake vaccination campaign in turned greatly harmed Pakistan polio vaccine drive in the tribal areas. Experts have criticised the CIA's fake vaccination drive to find bin Laden, stating that there could have been a better and more ethical way to find bin Laden.

2014 and 2015: Rapprochement

Following years of poor inter-governmental relations, the two countries began to cooperate more closely – particularly following the United States' use of drone missiles to strike at Pakistan's most-wanted militant Mullah Fazlullah on November 24, 2014, whom they "narrowly missed". The United States later used drone missiles to kill several of Pakistan's most wanted militants who were hiding in a remote region close to the Afghan border in November 2014. The Pakistani Zarb-e-Azb operation against militant in North Waziristan also, in the words of Lt. Gen. Joseph Anderson, "fractured" the Haqqani Network—long accused by the United States of having a safe harbor in Pakistan. The United States then captured and transferred a senior Taliban commander, Latif Mehsud, to Pakistan, which had been seeking his arrest. Following an unprecedented two-week-long visit by Pakistan's most senior military official Gen. Raheel Sharif, Rep. Adam Schiff stated that US-Pakistani relations were on the upswing following several tense years of dysfunction. Pakistan further killed senior Al-Qaeda leader Adnan el Shukrijumah—long wanted by the United States. Warming of relations, and increased security cooperation, between Afghanistan and Pakistan were also positive developments by the United States, which had long tried to mend relations between the two countries.

On 7 May 2015, according to an internal report prepared by Congressional Research Service, Pakistan has made full payment from its national funds towards the purchase of 18 new F-16C/D Fighting Falcon Block 52 combat aircraft worth US$1.43 billion. Also including F-16 armaments including 500 AMRAAM air-to-air missiles; 1,450 2,000-pound bombs; 500 JDAM Tail Kits for gravity bombs; and 1,600 Enhanced Paveway laser-guided kits. All this has cost Pakistan US$629 million. Pakistan has also paid US$298 million for 100 harpoon anti-ship missiles, 500 sidewinder air-to-air missiles (US$95 million); and seven Phalanx Close-In Weapons System naval guns (US$80 million). Under Coalition Support Funds (in the Pentagon budget), Pakistan received 26 Bell 412EP utility helicopters, along with related parts and maintenance, valued at US$235 million.

On February 11, 2016, US government has proposed US$860 million in aid for Pakistan during the 2016–17 fiscal year, including $265 million for military hardware in addition to counterinsurgency funds.

From 2017 to 2020

On August 21, 2017, Donald Trump announced his new strategy for Afghan War and accused Pakistan of providing safe havens to terrorists. "The Pakistani people have suffered greatly from terrorism and extremism. We recognize those contributions and those sacrifices, but Pakistan has also sheltered the same organizations that try every single day to kill our people", Trump said. Moreover, Trump also urged India for its role in the war. Trump's speech led to rise of anti-American sentiments in Pakistan and protests against Trump were held across the country. Two months later, Trump tweeted that he was starting to develop better relations with the Pakistani government.

On January 1, 2018, Donald Trump again criticized Pakistan, saying "they have given us nothing but lies and deceit". President Trump also announced cancelling a $300 million disbursement to Pakistan, citing the country's failure to take strong actions against Afghan Taliban militants and their safe havens in Pakistan.

However, the relations between the two countries improved after Pakistani Prime Minister Imran Khan visited United States and met President Donald Trump. Many experts viewed Khan's visit to United States as 'reset in the bilateral relationship between the two countries'. President Trump called for dramatically strengthening trade ties between Pakistan and the United States as America is a top export destination for Pakistan. President Trump also offered to mediate between India and Pakistan on Kashmir. However, Trump's offer was immediately rejected by Indian foreign office.

In September 2019, during a joint rally at Houston, Trump refused to endorse India's repeated allegations against Pakistan. After the joint rally, Trump called himself a 'friend' of Pakistan and termed Imran Khan as a 'great leader'.

In January 2020, President Trump once again held a meeting with Prime Minister Khan in Davos, on the sidelines of the World Economic Forum. President Trump hailed the growing relationship between the United States and Pakistan. He said that United States has never been closer with Pakistan than it is currently under his administration. This was the third meeting between the two countries and Trump once again offered to mediate on Kashmir issue. His remarks were welcomed by Prime Minister Khan.

After U.S. withdraws Afghanistan
US ‘clearly distanced’ itself from Pakistan after the United States troops withdraws Afghanistan in 2021, Imran Khan describing it as Afghans breaking "the shackles of slavery". Pakistan declined an invitation to the US's ‘Summit for Democracy’ under the Biden administration.

During the 2022 Pakistani constitutional crisis, Imran Khan blamed the US officials Donald Lu and named the United States as the country in question over a 'threatening letter', warns American 'regime change' for his downfall.

In a statement released at the end of the “Fourth Annual US-India 2+2 Ministerial Dialogue”, the United States and India call on Pakistan to take “irreversible action” to ensure that its soil is not used for terrorist attacks against any other country.

In October 2022, U.S. President Joe Biden called Pakistan “one of the most dangerous nations in the world” during an address in California while speaking about the changing global geopolitical situation. Pakistani Prime Minister Shehbaz Sharif and Foreign Minister Bilawal Bhutto Zardari rejected the statement as baseless, and the country’s acting foreign secretary summoned the U.S. ambassador for an explanation of Biden’s remarks.

Since Pakistani government decided to import Russian oil in 2023, United states had demonstrated positive relations with Pakistan by allowing them to purchase oil from Russia at a discounted price, despite not signing a Washington-backed price cap on Russian petroleum products.

Meetings between Pakistani and U.S. leaders

Visits by leaders of Pakistan

Visits by Presidents of the United States

Military science programs

Pakistan and atomic weapons
In 1955, after Prime Minister Huseyn Suhrawardy established nuclear power to ease of the electricity crises, with U.S. offering grant of US$350,000 to acquire a commercial nuclear power plant. Following this year, the PAEC signed an agreement with counterpart, the United States Atomic Energy Commission, where the research on nuclear power and training was started initially by the United States. During the 1960s, the U.S. opens doors to Pakistan's scientists and engineers to conduct research on leading institutions of the U.S., notably ANL, ORNL, and LLNL. In 1965, Abdus Salam went to U.S. and convinced the U.S. government to help establish a national institute of nuclear research in Pakistan (PINSTECH) and a research reactor Parr-I. The PINSTECH building was designed by leading American architect Edward Durrell Stone; American nuclear engineer Peter Karter designed the reactor, which was then supplied by the contractor American Machine and Foundry. Years later, the U.S. helped Pakistan to acquire its first commercial nuclear power plant, Kanupp-I, from GE Canada in 1965. All this nuclear infrastructure was established by the U.S. throughout the 1960s, as part of the Congressional Atoms for Peace program.

This was changed after Zulfikar Ali Bhutto and democratic socialists under him decided to build nuclear weapons for the sake of their national security and survival. In 1974, U.S. imposed embargo and restriction on Pakistan to limit its nuclear weapons program. The ban was lifted in early 1975, a decision that was protested by the government of Afghanistan. In the 1980s, the American concerns of Pakistan's role in nuclear proliferation eventually turned out to be true after the exposure of nuclear programs of Iran, North Korea, Saudi Arabia and Libya. Although the atomic program was effectively peaceful and devoted for economical usage, the nuclear policy change in the 1970s and till the present, with Pakistan maintaining its program as part of the strategic deterrence.

In the 1980s, the plan to recognize national security concerns and accepting Pakistan' assurances that it did not intend to construct a nuclear weapon, Congress waived restrictions (Symington Amendment) on military assistance to Pakistan. In October 1980, a high-level delegation and CMLA General Zia-ul-Haq travels to U.S., first meeting with former president Richard Nixon. Although, the meeting was to discuss the Soviet invasion of Afghanistan, Nixon made it clear he is in favor of Pakistan gaining nuclear weapons capability, while correcting that he is not in a race for the presidential elections. The following year, Agha Shahi made it clear to Alexander Haig that Pakistan "won't make a compromise" on its nuclear weapons program, but assured the U.S. that the country had adopted the policy of deliberate ambiguity, refraining itself to conduct nuclear tests to avoid or create divergence in the relations.

In March 1986, the two countries agreed on a second multi-year (FY 1988–93) $4-billion economic development and security assistance program. On October 1, 1990, however, the United States suspended all military assistance and new economic aid to Pakistan under the Pressler Amendment, which required that the President certify annually that Pakistan "does not possess a nuclear explosive device."

India's decision to conduct nuclear tests in May 1998 and Pakistan's response set back US relations in the region, which had seen renewed US interest during the second Clinton Administration. A presidential visit scheduled for the first quarter of 1998 was postponed and, under the Glenn Amendment, sanctions restricted the provision of credits, military sales, economic assistance, and loans to the government.

Nonproliferation and security
Since 1998, the governments of both countries have started an intensive dialogue on nuclear nonproliferation and security issues. First meeting took place in 1998 between Foreign Secretary Shamshad Ahmad and Deputy Secretary of State Strobe Talbott to discuss the issues focusing on CTBT signature and ratification, FMCT negotiations, export controls, and a nuclear restraint regime. The October 1999 overthrow of the democratically elected Sharif government triggered an additional layer of sanctions under Section 508 of the Foreign Appropriations Act which includes restrictions on foreign military financing and economic assistance. US Government assistance to Pakistan was limited mainly to refugee and counter-narcotics assistance." At the height of the nuclear proliferation case in 2004, President George Bush delivering a policy statement at the National Defense University, President Bush proposed to reform the IAEA to combat the nuclear proliferation and quoted: "No state, under investigation for proliferation violations, should be allowed to serve on the IAEA Board of Governors—or on the new special committee. And any state currently on the Board that comes under investigation should be suspended from the Board."

Bush's proposal was seen as targeted against Pakistan, which is an influential member of IAEA since the 1960s and serves on the Board of Governors; it did not receive attention from other world governments. In 2009, Pakistan has repeatedly blocked the Conference on Disarmament (CD) from implementing its agreed program of work, despite severe pressure from the major nuclear powers to end its defiance of 64 other countries in blocking international ban on the production of new nuclear bomb-making material, as well as discussions on full nuclear disarmament, the arms race in outer space, and security assurances for non-nuclear states. The Chairman Joint Chiefs General Tariq Majid justified Pakistan's action and outline the fact that atomic deterrence against a possible aggression was a compulsion, and not a choice for Pakistan. He further justified that "a proposed fissile material cutoff treaty would target Pakistan specifically.

On December 10, 2012, the Assistant Secretary for Arms Control, Verification, and Compliance Rose Gottemoeller and Additional Secretary for United Nations and Economic Coordination Aizaz Ahmad Chaudhry co-chaired the Pakistan-U.S. Security, Strategic Stability, and Nonproliferation (SSS&NP) Working Group in Islamabad. Gottemoeller traveled to Pakistan after former Indian Foreign Secretary Shyam Saran wrote in an article that, "Pakistan had moved its nuclear doctrine from minimum deterrence to second strike capability and expanded its arsenal to include tactical weapons that can be delivered by short-range missiles like the Hatf-IX. The meeting ended with an agreement on continuing dialogue on a range of issues related to the bilateral relationship, including international efforts to enhance nuclear security and peaceful applications of nuclear energy.

Space program

In the 1990s, U.S. and the Missile Technology Control Regime put restrictions on Pakistan's space program in amid fear that the country's alleged covert development of missile programs. The U.S. began cooperation with Pakistan in peaceful space technology in the 1960s after establishing the Sonmiani Terminal in 1961, constructing an airfield and launch pad. In 1962, the Space Research Commission launched the first solid-fuel rocket, Rehbar-I, built with close interaction with the U.S. NASA. Launching of the rocket made Pakistan the first South Asian country and tenth country in the world to carrying out the launch of the rocket. During the 1962 and 1972, approximately 200 rockets were fired from the Sonmiani, but this cooperation waned after 1972.

During the 1990s and early 2000s, U.S. tightened its embargo and construction on Pakistan's space development, and in 1998, putting restrictions and sanctions on premier astronautics research department, DESTO, although the sanctions were uplifted in 2001 by the Bush Administration.

Afghan war factor in Pakistan–United States relations

Present US-Pakistan relations are a case study on the difficulties of diplomacy and policy-making in a multipolar world. Pakistan has important geopolitical significance for both India and China, making unilateral action almost impossible for the US. At the same time, Pakistan remains a key player in American efforts in Afghanistan. The two countries are trying to build a strategic partnership, but there remains a significant trust deficit, which continues to hinder successful cooperation in combating common threats.

Despite recent setbacks, both Pakistan and the United States continue to seek a productive relationship to defeat terrorist organizations. It has been alleged that the ISI pays journalists to write articles hostile to the United States.

Military aid from the United States

70,000 civilians and more than 10,000 troops and policemen in Pakistan have died fighting the American war on terror, for which the United States has promised to fulfill all the expenditures of the war. However, according to Pakistani officials the US has not compensated as much as half of that money, but has only claimed so in the media. Pakistan is a major non-NATO ally as part of the War on Terrorism and provides key intelligence and logistical support for the United States. A leading recipient of US military assistance, Pakistan expects to receive approximately $20 billion since 2001 a combination of reimbursement to Pakistan and training programs for the Pakistan counter-terrorism units. However, in the aftermath of the Osama Bin Laden raid, Pakistan Army canceled a $500 million training program and sent all 135 trainers home. The United States showed displeasure at this act and withheld a further $300 million in assistance.

Some politicians in Pakistan argue the war on terror has cost the Pakistani economy $70 billion and U.S. aid costs the country more in the long term, leading to accusations that the US is making Pakistan a client state.

On 31 May 2012, Senator Rand Paul (R-Kentucky) called for the United States to suspend all aid to Pakistan and grant citizenship to a doctor who was jailed for helping hunt down Osama bin Laden.

Former United States Ambassador to the United Nations Zalmay Khalilzad demanded a "complete isolation policy" for Pakistan. He said that if Pakistan does not stop backing radicalism and extremism, the United States should suspend all aid to it and treat it as a second North Korea.

On 5 January 2018, US suspended about $2 billion in security aid to Pakistan for failing to clamp down on the Afghan Taliban and the Haqqani Network terror groups and dismantle their safe havens, a White House official said.

The freezing of all security assistance to Pakistan comes after President Donald Trump in a New Year's Day tweet accused the country of giving nothing to the US but "lies and deceit" and providing "safe haven" to terrorists in return for $33 billion aid since 2003.

Dispute over $300 million of military aid being postponed by Department of Defense
On September 1, 2018, the Department of Defense announced that they would postpone the transfer of approximately $300 million in military aid to Pakistan. According to The Economic Times Pakistani Foreign Minister, Shah Mehmood Qureshi stated, "The USD 300 million is neither aid nor assistance – it is the money Pakistan spent from its resources against militants and in the war against terrorism. This is the money they (US) are supposed to reimburse, but now either they are not willing or unable to pay back." The US is stating that the aid was part of the Coalition Support Fund (CFS) and was not previously owed to the country. The reason for the additional removal of aid, since the initial $500 million aid withdrawal in January 2018, is due to a lack of effort by the Pakistan Government in combating terrorist organizations in their country. The issue over the funding caused tensions in both countries. On September 5, 2018, Secretary of State Mike Pompeo visited Pakistan, the first visit of the Trump administration, but did not discuss the postponement of aid to the country.

Cultural influence
There is some presence of US based fast food chains in Pakistan such as Pizza Hut, KFC and Mcdonald's. South Asian cuisine including Pakistani also has a prominent presence in the USA.

See also
 Embassy of the United States, Islamabad
 Consulate General of the United States, Karachi
Muslims in the United States military
 Pakistanis in the United States military, American soldiers of Pakistani heritage
 Pakistan–United States skirmishes

References

Further reading
 Abbas, H. Pakistan's Drift into Extremism Allah, the Army and America's War on Terror (M. E. Sharpe, 2005).
 Bashir, Sadaf. "Pakistan's Engagement As A Frontline State In The US-Led ‘War On Terror’: Political, Economic And Strategic Dimensions" (Diss. Qurtuba University Of Science & Information Technology Peshawar (Pakistan), 2015.)  online
 Buck, Brandan P. "Brokering a Buffer State: Afghan Neutrality and American Diplomacy, 1973–1979." International History Review (2018): 1-20.
 Choudhury, G.W. India, Pakistan, Bangladesh, and the Major Powers: Politics of a Divided Subcontinent (1975), relations with US, USSR and China.
 Grimmett, Richard F. "US arms sales to Pakistan." (U.S. Library of Congress, Congressional Research Service, 2008) online
 
 Hathaway, R. M. The Leverage Paradox: Pakistan and the United States. (Woodrow Wilson International Center for Scholars 2017).
 Hilali, A. Z. US-Pakistan relationship: Soviet invasion of Afghanistan (Routledge, 2017).
 Khan, Mahrukh. "Pakistan-US Relations: Rethinking the Dependency Relationship." Strategic Studies 39.4 (2019). online
 Kronstadt, K. Alan. "Pakistan-US relations." (U.S. Library of Congress, Congressional Research Service, 2009) online.
 McMahon, Robert J. Cold War on the Periphery: The United States, India and Pakistan (1994)  excerpt and text search
 Malik, Naeem Mahboob, and Syed Khawaja Alqama. "Pakistan-US Relations: A Critical Analysis of Influence in post 9/11 Era." Pakistan Journal of Social Sciences (PJSS) 40.1 (2020): 33–42. online
 Pant, Harsh V. "The Pakistan thorn in China–India–US relations." Washington Quarterly 35.1 (2012): 83–95. online
 Powers, Thomas, "The War without End" (review of Steve Coll, Directorate S: The CIA and America's Secret Wars in Afghanistan and Pakistan, Penguin, 2018, 757 pp.), The New York Review of Books, vol. LXV, no. 7 (19 April 2018), pp. 42–43.
 
 Raghavan, Srinath. The Most Dangerous Place: A History of the United States in South Asia. (Penguin Random House India, 2018); also published as Fierce Enigmas: A History of the United States in South Asia.(2018). online review; also see excerpt; focus on India, Pakistan and Afghanistan; see pp 479–80 and passim.
 Sultana, Razia. "Major Threats to Pakistan in the Wake of US Withdrawal from Afghanistan: The Case of FATA and KP." FWU Journal of Social Sciences 1.1 (2015): 64.  online
 Wirsing, Robert G., and James M. Roherty. "The United States and Pakistan." International Affairs 58.4 (1982): 588-609 online.

External links
 Pakistani-American Population and Demographics 2014
 Pakistani Embassy and Consulate Jurisdictions in the United States
 The Washington Post – Highs and lows in U.S.-Pakistan relations: The two countries are allies but their relationship has been plagued by mistrust
 The News International – Normalcy in Pak-US ties will take time: President Zardari
 Newsline Magazine – US-Pak Relations Through the Decades

 
United States
Bilateral relations of the United States